Chomley is a surname. Notable people with this name include:

 Charles Henry Chomley (1868–1942), Australian farmer, barrister, writer and journalist
 Francis Chomley (1822–1892), Irish businessman in Hong Kong and China
 Hussey Chomley (1832–1906), Irish-born Australian police officer
 Patricia Downes Chomley (1910–2002), Australian nurse